Gabriel Fortes Chaves (born 11 February 2001), known as Gabriel Pec, is a Brazilian footballer who plays for Vasco da Gama. Mainly a winger, he can also play as an attacking midfielder.

Professional career
Pec joined the youth academy of Vasco da Gama in 2009. Pec made his professional debut for Vasco da Gama in a 2-0 Campeonato Brasileiro Série A loss to Esporte Clube Bahia on 7 September 2019.

References

External links
 
 ZeroZero Profile

2001 births
Living people
People from Petrópolis
Brazilian footballers
CR Vasco da Gama players
Campeonato Brasileiro Série A players
Campeonato Brasileiro Série B players
Association football defenders
Sportspeople from Rio de Janeiro (state)